Waylon and Company is an album by American country music artist Waylon Jennings, released on RCA Records in 1983.

Background
Jennings had recorded several duet albums in the past, including three in five years with Willie Nelson and one with his wife Jessi Colter in 1982, but Waylon and Company was his first album of duets with a host of guest artists.  The album is best remembered for "The Conversation," a #15 hit with Hank Williams, Jr. that addresses the legacy of Hank Williams (the pair also shot a popular music video for the song).  Waylon and Hank, Jr. also join an ailing Ernest Tubb on the defiant "Leave Them Boys Alone."  Emmylou Harris, Jerry Reed, Mel Tillis, Jessi Colter, and actor James Garner also make appearances, and Jennings sings one song with Tony Joe White. Bob McDill wrote the lone Jennings solo track, "I May Be Used (But I Ain't Used Up)," which peaked at #4.  The album contains the #1 hit single "Just to Satisfy You," a duet with Nelson which had actually been released in Black on Black LP two years earlier.  The album peaked at #12 on the Billboard country albums chart.  AllMusic deems the album "Fun for what it is."

Release history
In 1985, RCA reissued this as an 8-song album as part of its "Best Buy Series", omitting the tracks "So You Want to Be a Cowboy Singer" and "I'll Find It Where I Can".

"Waylon and Company" was the first Waylon Jennings album to be issued on CD in the US, Europe and Japan by RCA in 1983, under the catalog numbers PCD1-4826 (US) and PD 84826 (Europe/Japan).

For reasons unknown, this album, along with other RCA CDs, were pulled off the market in 1987. Though the songs have been reissued on various compilations, "Waylon and Company" has never been reissued in its original form.

Track listing
"Hold On! I'm Comin'" (David Porter, Isaac Hayes) – 2:33
With Jerry Reed
"Leave Them Boys Alone" (Dean Dillon, Hank Williams Jr., Gary Stewart, Tanya Tucker) – 3:32
With Hank Williams, Jr. and Ernest Tubb
"Spanish Johnny" (Paul Siebel, David Bromberg) – 3:51
With Emmylou Harris
"Just to Satisfy You" (Jennings, Don Bowman) – 2:49
With Willie Nelson
"So You Want to Be a Cowboy Singer" (Tony Joe White, Jennings) – 2:59
With Tony Joe White
"I May Be Used (But Baby I Ain't Used Up)" (Bob McDill) – 2:58
"Sight for Sore Eyes" (Danny Morrison, Chester Lester) – 3:47
With Jessi Colter
"I'll Find It Where I Can" (Michael B. Clark, Zak Van Arsdale) – 2:58
With James Garner
"The Conversation" (Hank Williams, Jr., Jennings, Richie Albright) – 3:51
With Hank Williams, Jr.
"Mason Dixon Lines" (Dan Mitchell) – 2:44
With Mel Tillis

Chart performance

References 

Waylon Jennings albums
1983 albums
RCA Records albums